Perry Barr Stadium (also known as Perry Barr Greyhound Stadium and previously as Alexander Sports Ground(s)) is a greyhound racing and motorcycle speedway stadium on Aldridge Road in Perry Barr, Birmingham, England. The track is operated by the Arena Racing Company (ARC), who lease it from owners the National Asset Management Agency. Racing takes place every Saturday evening, in addition to their four ARC fixtures.

Opened in 1929, it was built for Birchfield Harriers, who left in 1977. It is now used for greyhound racing and speedway. It is not to be confused with the Birchfield Ladbroke Stadium that is also known as the old Perry Barr Stadium which closed in 1984.

Location 

The stadium is opposite the former Birmingham City University main campus and close to (and served by) Perry Barr railway station. It sits in the fork of the A34 Walsall Road (to its West) and the A453 Aldridge Road. The River Tame flows northwards between the stadium and the A34.

Birchfield Harriers 
The stadium was originally constructed for an athletics club, Birchfield Harriers who held its opening ceremony on 27 July 1929, having purchased the land on 11 November 1926. The façade still carries their badge, a running stag, rendered in Art Deco style bas relief, carved in 1929 and attributed to William Bloye. The site was formerly a rubbish tip, chiefly for fly ash from a local power station.

Birchfield Cycling Club used the venue for cycle races, and, from the mid-1930s, the cycle track outside the running lanes was used by the Sunbac Speedway Club for dirt-track racing (speedway). In the 1930s and 40s, Aston Villa Football Club's second and third teams trained at the stadium.

Soon after the start of World War II, the stadium was requisitioned by the government and used by the Home Guard. Later in the war it was used to accommodate Italian prisoners of war; the last of these did not leave until January 1946 and the club only returned to the stadium the following month. Shortly afterwards, the club hired out the stadium on Saturday evenings, to Birmingham Speedway. Floodlighting was installed to facilitate the latter,  and this allowed for the first floodlit athletics meeting ever held in the United Kingdom, in September 1948, after the lights had been turned on near the end of an earlier meeting, which had overrun into dusk. Floodlit horse jumping competitions were also held.

On 29 May 1954 Diane Leather became the first woman to run a mile in less than 5 minutes, during the Midlands Women's AAA Championships at the ground.

In 1977, their centenary year, Birchfield Harriers moved to the newly built Alexander Stadium, nearby, and the old venue was renamed "Perry Barr Stadium".

Speedway 
The stadium is also the home of the Birmingham Brummies speedway team. The stadium was expanded in 2007 to facilitate a speedway track.

In 2008 the Stadium hosted the Elite League Riders Championship. It was won by Australian Jason Crump. In 2009 a round of the British Sidecar Speedway Championship took place at the Stadium, which was won by Rod Winterburn and Gareth Winterburn.

Greyhound Racing

Origins & Opening
Perry Barr had been without greyhound racing since 1984 following the surprise sale by Ladbrokes and subsequent demolition of the old Perry Barr stadium on Walsall Road, and known latterly as the Birchfield Ladbroke Stadium. However during 1990 negotiations started with the aim to re-introduce the sport at the Alexander Sports Ground across the other side of the A34. The stadium was no longer used for athletics because the new Alexander Stadium Stadium in Perry Park was serving this purpose. Maurice Buckland a former trainer and head of a consortium called the Perry Barr Greyhound Racing Club suggested the idea of greyhound racing at the venue it was given planning permission.

The new build was completed quickly and the new stadium opened on 16 October attracting trainers the calibre of Geoff DeMulder who guided Fearless Mustang to the 1991 English Greyhound Derby final as a Perry Barr trainer during the first Derby tilt for the new track. 

The circumference of the track was 435 metres with wide straights and bends and race distances of 275, 460, 500, 660, 710 and 895 metres. An 'Outside Sumner' hare was used on Tuesday and Thursday race nights overseen by Racing Manager Gary Woodward. There were kennels for 82 hounds on site.
A former trainer from the previous Perry Barr called Frank Baldwin took over as Racing Manager in 1991.

Recent History & GRA takeover
A major race called the Birmingham Cup was held at Perry Barr until 2009 and it also hosted the original classic race the Scurry Gold Cup from 2005-2008. Another Perry Barr hound called Heres Seanie (trained by Pat Ryan) reached the 1995 English Greyhound Derby final and Racing Managers included Ian Hillis and Tim Hales.

The Greyhound Racing Association (GRA) under their parent company Wembley plc planned to build a track in Liverpool and acquire Perry Barr. The former did not materialise but in May 2005 a £4.2 million takeover was agreed with the Perry Barr Greyhound Racing Club. Stephen Rea and Gary Woodward were brought in as the General and Racing Manager. After initial investment into the stadium the GRA brought the former classic race the Scurry Gold Cup to the track following the closure of Catford Stadium. The stadium hosted two trainers championships in 2005 and 2012 and inbetween the Scurry was moved to sister track Belle Vue Stadium but the rekindled Birmingham Cup was discontinued in 2009 leaving Perry Barr with no major event of note.

The track today uses an 'Outside Swaffham' hare and is a regular on the Bookmakers Afternoon Greyhound Service (BAGS) overseen by Racing Manager Martin Seal.

In recent years the GRA, under new parent company Risk Capital, ran into financial difficulties and unpaid loans resulted in NAMA (Ireland's National Asset Management Agency) taking control of the GRA. In 2013 an agreement was brokered securing the use of the stadium by the GRA until at least 2026 from parent company NAMA; and as Perry Barr has since become the only remaining GRA stadium not to be sold to other commercial investors by NAMA it remains the most secure stadium still operating under the GRA banner.

In 2017 the stadium was awarded the prestigious St Leger after it switched from sister track Wimbledon. One year later in 2018 the stadium signed a deal with ARC to race on Monday, Thursday and Saturday lunchtimes and Sunday afternoon.

ARC takeover
In October 2019 GRA Acquisition sold the lease to the Arena Racing Company

In 2021 the stadium was given the prestigious Laurels and Oaks and now holds four of the original classic races the St Leger, Laurels, Oaks and Scurry Gold Cup.

Competitions

St Leger

Laurels

Oaks

Scurry Gold Cup

Birmingham Cup

Guineas

Track records

Current

Former

References

External links
 "Almost the 5 Minute Mile" Pathe newsreel filmed at the ground, 31 May 1954

Sports venues in Birmingham, West Midlands
History of Birmingham, West Midlands
Birchfield Harriers
Greyhound racing venues in the United Kingdom
Perry Barr
Sports venues completed in 1929
Sport in Birmingham, West Midlands
Speedway venues in England